Salvador Márquez (born 24 December 1950) is a Mexican former footballer. He competed in the men's tournament at the 1972 Summer Olympics.

References

External links
 
 

1950 births
Living people
Mexican footballers
Mexico international footballers
Olympic footballers of Mexico
Footballers at the 1972 Summer Olympics
Place of birth missing (living people)
Association football midfielders
C.D. Guadalajara footballers